Calyptis is a genus of moths in the family Erebidae.

Species
Calyptis idonea Stoll, 1780
Calyptis iter Guenée, 1852
Calyptis semicuprea Walker, 1857

References
Natural History Museum Lepidoptera genus database

Ommatophorini
Moth genera